Zaro's Family Bakery is an American family-owned bakery, operating in the New York City metropolitan area.

History
The bakery was founded in The Bronx in 1927,  by Joseph Zarubchik, a Polish immigrant, and is now operated by his grandsons, Stuart and Joseph.

In 1977, the company opened its first of three stores in Grand Central Terminal, followed by stores in Pennsylvania Station and the Port Authority Bus Terminal – all in the Manhattan borough of New York City.

It manufactures all of its own products.
Supreme Court Justice Sonia Sotomayor worked at Zaro's Bakery as a teenager.

Store locations

Parkchester, Bronx, NY (since 1959)
Grand Central Terminal, New York, NY (since 1977)
New York Penn Station, New York, NY
Newark Penn Station, Newark, NJ
501 Seventh Avenue, New York, NY
Port Authority Bus Terminal, New York, NY
1825 Park Avenue, Harlem, NY
Macy's Herald Square, New York, NY

See also

 List of bakeries

External links
 , the company's official website

References 

Bakeries of the United States
Restaurants established in 1927
Restaurants in New York City
Parkchester, Bronx
1927 establishments in New York City